The following is a list of cities that have implemented smart city initiatives, organized by continent and then alphabetically. 

The Institute for Management Development and Singapore University of Technology and Design rank cities in the Smart City Index. In the Smart City Index 2021, the top ten smart cities were, in order, Singapore, Zurich, Oslo, Taipei City, Lausanne, Helsinki, Copenhagen, Geneva, Auckland, and Bilbao.

Asia

Dubai, UAE
In 2013, the Smart Dubai project was initiated by Shaikh Mohammad bin Rashid Al Maktoum, vice president of UAE, which contained more than 100 initiatives to make Dubai a smart city by 2030. The project aimed to integrate private and public sectors, enabling citizens to access these sectors through their smartphones. Some initiatives include the Dubai Autonomous Transportation Strategy to create driverless transits, fully digitizing government, business and customer information and transactions, and providing citizens 5000 hotspots to access government applications by 2021. 

Two mobile applications, mPay and DubaiNow, facilitate various payment services for citizens ranging from utilities or traffic fines to educational, health, transport, and business services. In addition, the Smart Nol Card is a unified rechargeable card enabling citizens to pay for all transportation services such as metro, buses, water bus, and taxis. There is also the Dubai Municipality's Digital City initiative which assigns each building a unique QR code that citizens can scan containing information about the building, plot, and location.

The Smart City Index 2021, published by the Institute for Management Development and Singapore University of Technology and Design, ranked Dubai and Abu Dhabi as the smartest cities in the region of the Middle East and North Africa, and in positions 28 and 29 worldwide.

GIFT City, India 
GIFT City is India's first operational greenfield smart city. It is being developed as an International Financial Hub. Work on Core Infrastructure has fully been completed. It is the First South Asian City which has a Centralised District Cooling Centre and Automated Solid Waste Collection System. Many Commercial Buildings, A School, Gujarat Biotechnology University, are complete. Work on several Residential projects is going on. Two International Stock Exchanges, Several International Banks and Fin-tech Firms are currently operating from this city. IBM opened its software lab in the city in September 2022. Work on GIFT Riverfront started in September 2022.

Isfahan, Iran 
Isfahan has a smart city program, a unified human resources administration system, and transport system.

Neom, Saudi Arabia

NEOM is the name of a future planned city to be built in Tabuk Province in northwestern Saudi Arabia. It is planned to incorporate smart city technologies and to function as a tourist destination. The site is north of the Red Sea, east of Egypt across the Gulf of Aqaba, and south of Jordan. It will cover a total area of 26,500 km2 (10,200 sq mi) and will extend 460 km along the coast of the Red Sea.

New Songdo City, South Korea

Songdo International Business District is planned to be a smart city.

Shanghai, China
Shanghai's development of the IoT and internet connection speeds have allowed for third-party companies to revolutionize the productivity of the city. As mobile ride share giant, DiDi Chuxing, continuously adds more user protection features such as ride recording, and a new quick response safety center, Shanghai is furthering their smart city agenda. During the first China International Import Expo, Shanghai focused on smart mobility and implemented sensors to accept smartphone traffic cards in all metro stations and buses to increase efficiency in the city.

Singapore

Singapore, a city-state, has embarked on transforming towards a "Smart Nation", and endeavours to harness the power of networks, data and info-comm technologies to improve living, create economic opportunities and build closer communities.

Taipei, Taiwan

Taipei started the "smarttaipei" project in 2016, where the major concept of is to change the culture of city hall government to be able to adopt new ideas and new concepts called bottom-up mechanism. The Taipei City government established the "Taipei Smart City Project Management Office", also known as the "PMO", to implement and governance the development of smart city. Thereafter, building an innovation matchmaking platform to combine industry and government resources to develop smart solutions that satisfy public demands.

PMO accept proposals from industry and help to negotiate with relative department of Taipei city to initiate new proof of concept(PoC) project, with the help of a matchmaking platform which allows citizens access necessary innovative technologies. There are more than 150 PoC Project established, and only 34% project finished.

Australia

Brisbane 
Brisbane launched a project to install poles around the city that would keep track of important information such as air quality or environmental noise. The information they collect is used by the city council to improve operations around the city. They also serve as street lights, have outlets for charging, and Wi-Fi.

Europe

Amsterdam, Netherlands 

The Amsterdam smart city initiative, which began in 2009, currently includes 170+ projects collaboratively developed by local residents, government and businesses. These projects run on an interconnected platform through wireless devices to enhance the city's real-time decision making abilities. 

To promote efforts from local residents, the City runs the Amsterdam Smart City Challenge annually, accepting proposals for applications and developments that fit within the city's framework. 
An example of a resident developed app is Mobypark, which allows owners of parking spaces to rent them out to people for a fee. The data generated from this app can then be used by the city to determine parking demand and traffic flows in Amsterdam. A number of homes have also been provided with smart energy meters, with incentives provided to those that actively reduce energy consumption. 

Other initiatives include flexible street lighting (smart lighting) which allows municipalities to control the brightness of street lights, and smart traffic management where traffic is monitored in real time by the city and information about current travel time on certain roads is broadcast to allow motorists to determine the best routes to take. The City of Amsterdam claims the purpose of the projects is to reduce traffic, save energy and improve public safety.

Barcelona, Spain
Barcelona has established a number of projects that can be considered 'smart city' applications within its "CityOS" strategy. For example, sensor technology has been implemented in the irrigation system in Parc del Centre de Poblenou, where real time data is transmitted to gardening crews about the level of water required for the plants. Barcelona has also designed a new bus network based on data analysis of the most common traffic flows in Barcelona, utilising primarily vertical, horizontal and diagonal routes with a number of interchanges. Integration of multiple smart city technologies can be seen through the implementation of smart traffic lights as buses run on routes designed to optimise the number of green lights. In addition, where an emergency is reported in Barcelona, the approximate route of the emergency vehicle is entered into the traffic light system, setting all the lights to green as the vehicle approaches through a mix of GPS and traffic management software, allowing emergency services to reach the incident without delay. Much of this data is managed by the Sentilo Platform.

Copenhagen, Denmark
In 2014, Copenhagen claimed the prestigious World Smart Cities Award for its "Connecting Copenhagen" smart city development strategy. Positioned in the Technical and Environmental Administration of Copenhagen, the smart city initiatives are coordinated by Copenhagen Solutions Lab, the city's administrative unit for smart city development. There are other notable actors in Greater Copenhagen that coordinate and initiate smart city initiatives including State of Green and Gate21, the latter of which has initiated the innovation hub smart city Cluster Denmark.

In an article with The Economist, a current major smart city project is explained: "In Copenhagen, as in many cities around the world, air quality is high on the agenda when it comes to liveability, with 68 percent of citizens citing it as of high importance when it comes to what makes their city attractive. To monitor pollution levels, Copenhagen Solutions Lab is currently working with Google and has installed monitoring equipment in their streetview car in order to produce a heatmap of air quality around the city. The information will help cyclists and joggers plan routes with the best air quality. The project also gives a glimpse of the future, when this kind of information could be collected in real time by sensors all over the city and collated with traffic flow data."

In another article with The World Economic Forum, Marius Sylvestersen, Program Director at Copenhagen Solutions Lab, explains that public-private collaborations must be built on transparency, the willingness to share data and must be driven by the same set of values. This requires a particularly open mindset from the organisations that wish to get involved. To facilitate open collaboration and knowledge-sharing, Copenhagen Solutions Lab launched the Copenhagen Street Lab in 2016. Here, organisations such as TDC, Citelum and Cisco work in collaboration with Copenhagen Solutions Lab to identify new solutions to city and citizen problems.

Dublin, Ireland
Dublin has been refereed to as an unexpected capital for smart cities. The smart city programme for the city is run by Smart Dublin an initiative of the four Dublin Local Authorities to engage with smart technology providers, researchers and citizens to solve city challenges and improve city life. It includes Dublinked - Dublin's open data platform that hosts open source data to smart city applications.

Gdynia, Poland
Gdynia was the first city in Eastern Europe to receive the ISO 37120 certificate issued by the World Council on City Data.
In 2015, the TRISTAR intelligent road traffic management system was implemented in the city.
Trolleybuses in Gdynia have been operating since 1943 and are still being developed as low-emission transport - some of them have their own batteries, which allows them to reach areas with no traction.

Over 200 sets of up-to-date data from 21 areas of the city's functioning are published on the Open Data portal. The data sets meet the requirements of machine readability and are also presented in a way comprehensible to users.
There is also an Urban Lab for cooperation between residents, experts and representatives of city structures.

Kyiv, Ukraine
Kiev has a transport dispatch system. It contains GPS trackers, installed on public transportation, as well as 6,000 video surveillance cameras which monitor the traffic. The accrued data is used by local Traffic Management Service and transport application developers.

London, UK
In London, a traffic management system known as SCOOT optimizes green light time at traffic intersections by feeding back magnetometer and inductive loop data to a supercomputer, which can co-ordinate traffic lights across the city to improve traffic throughout.

Madrid, Spain
Madrid, Spain's pioneering smart city, has adopted the MiNT Madrid Inteligente/Smarter Madrid platform to integrate the management of local services. These include the sustainable and computerized management of infrastructure, garbage collection and recycling, and public spaces and green areas, among others. The programme is run in partnership with IBMs INSA, making use of the latter's Big Data and analytics capabilities and experience. Madrid is considered to have taken a bottom-up approach to smart cities, whereby social issues are first identified and individual technologies or networks are then identified to address these issues. This approach includes support and recognition for start ups through the Madrid Digital Start Up programme.

Malta
A document written in 2011 refers to 18th century Żejtun as the earliest "smart city" in Malta, but not in the modern context of a smart city. By the 21st century, SmartCity Malta, a planned technology park, became partially operational while the rest is under construction, as a Foreign Direct Investment.

Manchester, UK
In December 2015, Manchester's CityVerve project was chosen as the winner of a government-led technology competition and awarded £10m to develop an Internet of Things (IoT) smart cities demonstrator.

Established in July 2016, the project is being carried out by a consortium of 22 public and private organisations, including Manchester City Council, and is aligned with the city's on-going devolution commitment.

The project has a two-year remit to demonstrate the capability of IoT applications and address barriers to deploying smart cities, such as city governance, network security, user trust and adoption, interoperability, scalability and justifying investment.

CityVerve is based on an open data principle that incorporates a "platform of platforms" which ties together applications for its four key themes: transport and travel; health and social care; energy and the environment; culture and the public realm. This will also ensure that the project is scalable and able to be redeployed to other locations worldwide.

Milan, Italy
Milan was prompted to begin its smart city strategies and initiatives by the European Union's Smart Cities and Communities initiative. However, unlike many European cities, Milan's Smart city strategies focus more on social sustainability rather than environmental sustainability. This focus is almost exclusive to Milan and has a major influence in the way content and way its strategies are implemented as shown in the case study of the Bicocca District in Milan.

Milton Keynes, UK
Milton Keynes has a commitment to making itself a smart city. Currently the mechanism through which this is approached is the MK:Smart initiative, a collaboration of local government, businesses, academia and 3rd sector organisations. The focus of the initiative is on making energy use, water use and transport more sustainable whilst promoting economic growth in the city. Central to the project is the creation of a state-of-the-art 'MK Data Hub' which will support the acquisition and management of vast amounts of data relevant to city systems from a variety of data sources. These will include data about energy and water consumption, transport data, data acquired through satellite technology, social and economic datasets, and crowdsourced data from social media or specialised apps.

The MK:Smart initiative has two aspects which extend our understanding of how smart Cities should operate. The first, Our MK, is a scheme for promoting citizen-led sustainability issues in the city. The scheme provides funding and support to engage with citizens and help turn their ideas around sustainability into a reality. The second aspect is in providing citizens with the skills to operate effectively in a smart city. The Urban Data school is an online platform to teach school students about data skills while the project has also produced a MOOC to inform citizens about what a smart city is.

Moscow, Russia
Moscow has been implementing smart solutions since 2011 by creating the main infrastructure and local networks. Over the past few years Moscow Government implemented a number of programs, contributing to its IT development.
So, Information City programme was launched and subsequently implemented from 2012 to 2018. The initial purpose of the programme was to make daily life for citizens safe and comfortable through the large-scale introduction of information and communication technologies.

In the summer of 2018, Moscow Mayor Sergey Sobyanin announced the city's smart city project, aimed at applying modern technologies in all areas of city life. In June 2018, the global management consultancy McKinsey announced that Moscow is one of the world's top 50 cities for smart technologies.

Smart City technologies have been deployed in healthcare, education, transport and municipal services. The initiative aims to improve quality of life, make urban government more efficient and develop an information society. There are more than 300 digital initiatives within the smart city project, with electronic services now widely provided online and through multifunctional centers. Moscow's citywide Wi-Fi project was launched in 2012 and now provides more than 16,000 Wi-Fi internet access points. The total number of access points will exceed 20,500 by early 2021. Moscow is actively developing eco-friendly transport using electric buses, and autonomous cars will soon be tested on the city's streets. Other initiatives include Moscow's Electronic School programme, its blockchain-based Active Citizen project and smart traffic management.

Santander, Spain
The city of Santander in Cantabria, northern Spain, has 20,000 sensors connecting buildings, infrastructure, transport, networks and utilities, offers a physical space for experimentation and validation of the IoT functions, such as interaction and management protocols, device technologies, and support services such as discovery, identity management and security. In Santander, the sensors monitor the levels of pollution, noise, traffic and parking.

Stockholm, Sweden

Stockholm's smart city technology is underpinned by the Stokab dark fibre system which was developed in 1994 to provide a universal fibre optic network across Stockholm. Private companies are able to lease fibre as service providers on equal terms. The company is owned by the City of Stockholm itself. Within this framework, Stockholm has created a Green IT strategy. The Green IT program seeks to reduce the environmental impact of Stockholm through IT functions such as energy efficient buildings (minimising heating costs), traffic monitoring (minimising the time spent on the road) and development of e-services (minimising paper usage). The e-Stockholm platform is centred on the provision of e-services, including political announcements, parking space booking and snow clearance. This is further being developed through GPS analytics, allowing residents to plan their route through the city. An example of district-specific smart city technology can be found in the Kista Science City region. This region is based on the triple helix concept of smart cities, where university, industry and government work together to develop computing applications for implementation in a smart city strategy.

Tallinn, Estonia 
Tallinn was a recipient in 2020 of the Netexplo Smart Cities 2020 Prize for digital transformation. Since 2013, Tallinn has offered free public transit to its residents, coordinated through pairing of contactless fare cards with national identity cards via digital public portal. Tallinn also hosts the FinEst Centre for Smart Cities, a collaborative research institution investigating autonomous public transport and smart grid solutions. The nation of Estonia has a program called e-Estonia, which allows for transnational digital residency and electronic voting.

North America

United States

Columbus, Ohio 
In the summer of 2017, the City of Columbus, Ohio began its pursuit of a smart city initiative. The city partnered with American Electric Power Ohio to create a group of new electric vehicle charging stations. Many smart cities such as Columbus are using agreements such as this one to prepare for climate change, expand electric infrastructure, convert existing public vehicle fleets to electric cars, and create incentives for people to share rides when commuting. For doing this, the U.S. Department of Transportation gave the City of Columbus a $40 million grant. The city also received $10 million from Vulcan Inc.

One key reason why the utility was involved in the picking of locations for new electric vehicle charging stations was to gather data. According to Daily Energy Insider, the group Infrastructure and Business Continuity for AEP said, "You don't want to put infrastructure where it won't be used or maintained. The data we collect will help us build a much bigger market in the future."

Because autonomous vehicles are currently seeing "an increased industrial research and legislative push globally", building routes and connections for them is another important part of the Columbus smart city initiative.

New York City, New York 
New York is developing a number of smart city initiatives. An example is the series of city service kiosks in the LinkNYC network. These provide services including free WiFi, phone calls, device charging stations, local wayfinding, and more, funded by advertising that plays on the kiosk's screens.

San Leandro, California 
The city of San Leandro is in the midst of transforming from an industrial center to a tech hub of the Internet of things (IoT) (technology that lets devices communicate with each other over the Internet). California's utility company PG&E is working with the city in this endeavor and on a smart energy pilot program that would develop a distributed energy network across the city that would be monitored by IoT sensors. The goal would be to give the city an energy system that has enough capacity to receive and redistribute electricity to and from multiple energy sources.

Santa Cruz, California 
In Santa Cruz, local authorities previously analyzed historical crime data in order to predict police requirements and maximize police presence where it is required. The analytical tools generate a list of 10 places each day where property crimes are more likely to occur, and then placing police efforts on these regions when officers are not responding to any emergency. The city of Santa Cruz suspended the use of predictive policing technology in 2018, after there were questions about its validity in such a small community.

References 

Lists of cities